POWRi (Performance Open Wheeled Racing, inc.) is an oval track racing sanctioning body based in the United States, founded by promoter Kenny Brown.

It organizes the Lucas Oil POWRi National Midget Series, a midget car racing series rival to the USAC National Midget Series, as well as the Lucas Oil POWRi West Series and Lucas Oil Outlaw Midget Series feeder series. Also it organizes the POWRi WAR Sprints, a wingless sprint car racing series, plus the POWRi 600cc Outlaw Micro Sprints.

Drivers that have competed in POWRi events include Tony Stewart, Kyle Larson, Bryan Clauson, Brady Bacon, Christopher Bell, Dave Darland, Rico Abreu and Andrew Felker.

Cars
Sprint cars weight 1,475 pounds and have 410 cu in engines that produce 900 horsepower.

A typical Midget weighs about 1,000 pounds and produces up to 350 horsepower from its four-cylinder engine. They are intended to be driven for races of relatively short distances, usually 2.5 to 25 miles (4 to 40 km).

History 
The Lucas Oil POWRi West Series was launched in 2012.

POWRi is the only current midget series to compete at Lucas Oil Speedway in Wheatland, Missouri.

POWRi has expanded to other countries in order to grow midget racing on an international level. It entered into a multi-year agreement to sanction the POWRi Lucas Oil Australian Speedcar Super Series and the POWRi Lucas Oil New Zealand Midget Super Series. The three series operate under the same technical regulations and procedures. It establishes a platform for a Midget World Championship, which POWRi organized for the 2013/14 season. The 16-race series began in Australia and New Zealand in December 2013 and it ended in June 2014 with four events in Illinois, United States.

In November 2016, POWRi announced that they would begin to sanction the Lucas Oil POWRi WAR Sprint Car Series for the 2017 season. The organization sanctioned the Elite Sprint Car Series for the 2018 season, but the partnership was dissolved in 2019.

POWRi Lucas Oil National Midget League 
Lucas Oil is the title sponsor for the National Midgets; they are 900 pound cars putting out up to 370 horsepower racing on dirt tracks from 1/5-mile bullrings to high banked half miles. 

Drivers such as Tony Stewart, Jeff Gordon, Ken Schrader, Kasey Kahne, Ryan Newman, Kyle Larson, Christopher Bell and Rico Abreu plus many others have used these cars as stepping-stones to Nascar and the IRL.

Champions

Lucas Oil POWRi National Midget League

 2021- Bryant Wiedeman (Colby, KS)

 2020- Jake Neuman (New Berlin, IL)

2019 - Jesse Colwell (Red Bluff, CA)
2018 - Tucker Klaasmeyer (Paola, KS)
2017 - Logan Seavey (Sutter, CA)
2016 - Zach Daum (Pocahontas, IL)
2015 - Darren Hagen (Riverside, CA)
2014 - Zach Daum (Pocahontas, Illinois)
2013 - Zach Daum (Pocahontas, Illinois)
2012 - Andrew Felker (Carl Junction, MO)
2011 - Brad Loyet (Sunset Hills, MO)
2010 - Brad Loyet (Sunset Hills, MO)
2009 - Brad Kuhn (Avon, IN)
2008 - Brett Anderson (Belleville, IL)
2007 - Brad Loyet (Sunset Hills, MO)
2006 - Brad Kuhn (Avon, IN)
2005 - Mike Hess (Riverton, IL)

Lucas Oil POWRi West Midget League

 2021- Emilo Hoover (Broken Arrow, OK)
 2020- Andrew Felker (Carl Junction, MO)
 2019 - Andrew Felker (Carl Junction, MO)
2018 - Kory Schudy (Springfield, MO)
2017 - Grady Chandler (Edmond, OK)
2016 - Steven Shebester (Pauls Valley, OK)
2015 - Anton Hernandez (Arlington, TX)
2014 - Alex Sewell (Broken Arrow, OK)

Lucas Oil POWRi WAR Sprint Car League

2021- Mario Clouser (Chatham, IL)
2020 - Riley Kreisel (Warsaw, MO)
2019 - Riley Kreisel (Warsaw, MO)
2018 - Riley Kreisel (Warsaw, MO)
2017 - Korey Weyant (Springfield, IL)

Lucas Oil POWRi 600cc Outlaw Micro Sprint League 

2021- Bradley Fezard (Bonnerdale, AR)
2020- Harley Hollan (Tulsa, OK)
2019 - Gunner Ramey (Sedalia, MO)
2018 - Harley Hollan (Tulsa, OK)
2017 - Joe B. Miller (Millersville, NO)
2016 - Nathan Benson (Concordia, MO)
2015 - Nathan Benson (Concordia, MO)
2014 - Nathan Benson (Concordia, MO)
2013 - Nathan Benson (Concordia, MO)
2012 - Joe B. Miller (Millersville, MO)
2011 - Trent Beckinger (Evansville, IN)
2010 - Jeremy Camp (Blue Mound, IL)
2009 - Dereck King (Goreville, IL)
2008 - Dereck King (Goreville, IL)
2007 - Dereck King (Goreville, IL)
2006 - Kevin Bayer (Bixby, OK)
2005 - Daniel Robinson (Mt. Vernon, IL)

POWRi WAR East / Wildcard Sprints
2018 - Landon Simon (Brownsburg, IN)
2017 - Korey Weyant (Springfield, IL)

POWRi Elite Sprints
2018 - Paul White (Waco, TX)

References

External links
Official website
Official Facebook page
 Midget World Championship announced - Speedcafe, 20 December 2013
 POWRi To Sanction World Midget Series - National Speed Sport News, 18 December 2013

Auto racing series in the United States
Midget car racing